Dextromethorphan/bupropion (DXM/BUP), sold under the brand name Auvelity, is a combination medication for the treatment of major depressive disorder (MDD). It contains an extended-release combination of dextromethorphan (DXM) and bupropion. The medication is modestly more effective in the treatment of depression than placebo or bupropion alone. It is taken as a tablet by mouth.

Side effects of dextromethorphan/bupropion include dizziness, headache, diarrhea, somnolence, dry mouth, sexual dysfunction, and hyperhidrosis, among others. Dextromethorphan acts as an NMDA receptor antagonist, σ1 receptor agonist, and serotonin–norepinephrine reuptake inhibitor, among other actions, while bupropion acts as a norepinephrine–dopamine reuptake inhibitor and nicotinic acetylcholine receptor negative allosteric modulator. Bupropion is also a potent inhibitor of CYP2D6, and thereby inhibits the metabolism of dextromethorphan. The mechanism of action of dextromethorphan/bupropion in the treatment of depression is unknown.

Dextromethorphan/bupropion was developed by Axsome Therapeutics and was approved for the treatment of major depressive disorder in the United States in August 2022.

Medical uses

Depression

Dextromethorphan/bupropion is approved for the treatment of major depressive disorder. Dextromethorphan and bupropion have both individually been reported to be effective for the treatment of this condition. The effect size of bupropion alone relative to placebo for depression is small, whereas only limited evidence exists for dextromethorphan alone. The combination was approved in the US on the basis of two regulatory clinical trials.

In Study 1 (GEMINI), a 6-week randomized controlled trial of dextromethorphan/bupropion versus placebo in people with major depressive disorder, scores on the Montgomery–Åsberg Depression Rating Scale (MADRS)—a scale with a range of 0 to 60points—decreased with dextromethorphan/bupropion by 15.9points from a baseline score of 33.6points (an approximate 47% reduction) and decreased with placebo by 12.1points from a baseline score of 33.2points (an approximate 36% reduction). This resulted in a least-squares mean difference in reduction of depression scores between  dextromethorphan/bupropion and placebo of 3.9points, with the placebo group showing approximately 76% of the improvement in depression scores as the dextromethorphan/bupropion group and with depression scores at baseline improving overall about 11% more with the medication than with placebo. In antidepressant trials of 6 to 8weeks duration recorded in the Food and Drug Administration (FDA) database, the average difference from placebo with other antidepressants was 2.5points. The improvement in scores with dextromethorphan/bupropion was statistically significant relative to placebo at all assessed timepoints including at the end of week 1. Hence, the medication appears to help reduce depressive symptoms by the end of the first week of treatment.

In Study 2 (STRIDE-1), dextromethorphan/bupropion was compared with bupropion alone in another randomized controlled trial. In this study, dextromethorphan/bupropion showed significantly greater improvement than bupropion alone in the first two weeks of treatment but not by week 6 of treatment in people with major depressive disorder. The baseline scores were 33.4points with dextromethorphan/placebo and 33.2points with placebo, while the score reductions at week 1 were 5.2points on the MADRS with dextromethorphan/bupropion and 3.6points with bupropion (a 1.6-point difference), at week 2 were 8.0points with dextromethorphan/bupropion and 6.1points with bupropion (a 1.9-point difference), and at week 6 were 11.6points with dextromethorphan/bupropion and 9.4points with bupropion (a 2.2-point difference). On the basis of this trial, the FDA concluded that dextromethorphan contributes to the apparent antidepressant effects of dextromethorphan/bupropion.

Available forms
Dextromethorphan/bupropion is available in the form of extended-release oral tablets containing 45mg dextromethorphan hydrobromide and 105mg bupropion hydrochloride per tablet.

Side effects
Side effects of dextromethorphan/bupropion include dizziness, nausea, headache, diarrhea, somnolence, dry mouth, sexual dysfunction (including abnormal orgasm, erectile dysfunction, decreased libido, and anorgasmia), hyperhidrosis, anxiety, constipation, decreased appetite, insomnia, arthralgia, fatigue, paresthesia, and blurred vision. These side effects occurred at rates ≥2% and to a greater extent than with placebo in clinical trials. Of people treated with dextromethorphan/bupropion, 4% discontinued participation due to side effects, whereas 0% of people who received placebo did so.

Pharmacology

Pharmacodynamics
Dextromethorphan acts as an NMDA receptor antagonist, serotonin–norepinephrine reuptake inhibitor, σ1 receptor agonist, and nicotinic acetylcholine receptor negative allosteric modulator, among other actions, whereas bupropion acts as a norepinephrine–dopamine reuptake inhibitor and nicotinic acetylcholine receptor negative allosteric modulator. Dextromethorphan/bupropion has less activity as an NMDA receptor antagonist than dextromethorphan alone. This is because bupropion is a potent CYP2D6 inhibitor and prevents the bioactivation of dextromethorphan into dextrorphan, a much more potent NMDA receptor antagonist than dextromethorphan itself. The mechanism of action of dextromethorphan/bupropion in the treatment of depression is unknown, although the preceding pharmacological actions are assumed to be involved.

Pharmacokinetics
When administered together as dextromethorphan/bupropion, the elimination half-life of dextromethorphan is 22hours and the elimination half-life of bupropion is 15hours. The elimination half-lives of bupropion active metabolites are 35hours for hydroxybupropion, 44hours for erythrohydrobupropion, and 33hours for threohydrobupropion. Bupropion inhibits the metabolism of dextromethorphan by inhibiting the enzyme CYP2D6, the major enzyme responsible for the metabolism of dextromethorphan. This in turn improves the bioavailability of dextromethorphan, prolongs its half-life, prevents its metabolism into dextrorphan, and increases the ratio of dextromethorphan to dextrorphan in the body.

History
Dextromethorphan/bupropion was developed by Axsome Therapeutics. It was approved for the treatment of major depressive disorder by the US Food and Drug Administration in August 2022.

Society and culture

Brand names
Dextromethorphan/bupropion is sold under the brand name Auvelity.

Availability
Dextromethorphan/bupropion is available in the United States.

Legal status
Dextromethorphan/bupropion is not a controlled substance in the United States. The misuse potential of dextromethorphan and bupropion has not been systematically studied. However, both dextromethorphan and bupropion may have misuse liability at supratherapeutic doses. Despite the known misuse potential of dextromethorphan, it is available widely as an over-the-counter drug. Conversely, bupropion is a prescription-only medication.

Research
Dextromethorphan/bupropion is under development for the treatment of agitation in Alzheimer's disease and smoking withdrawal. As of August 2022, it is in phase III clinical trials for agitation and phase II trials for smoking withdrawal.

References

Antidepressants
Combination drugs